The 1969 North American Soccer League season was the second season of the North American Soccer League, the top division in US soccer in 1969.

Five teams competed in the league's 2nd season. The season was divided into two parts; the International Cup and the regular season. The Kansas City Spurs won the International Cup. The Kansas City Spurs also won the NASL championship by finishing at the top of the table in the regular season. For the second straight year the team with the best winning percentage (Atlanta) did not win the premiership due to the NASL's points system. But unlike the previous year, the Chiefs got no opportunity to claim any title, as this would be the only year that the league did not hold a post-season Championship Final.

Changes from the previous season
No new teams were added and total of 12 teams folded between the 1968 and 1969 seasons:

Boston Beacons
Chicago Mustangs
Cleveland Stokers
Detroit Cougars

Houston Stars
Los Angeles Wolves
New York Generals
Oakland Clippers

San Diego Toros
Toronto Falcons
Vancouver Royals
Washington Whips

1969 NASL International Cup

The NASL held a double round-robin tournament that was called the International Cup. The league imported teams from England and Scotland to stand in for the U.S. clubs.

Atlanta Chiefs were represented by Aston VillaBaltimore Bays were represented by West Ham UnitedDallas Tornado were represented by Dundee UnitedKansas City Spurs were represented by Wolverhampton WanderersSt. Louis Stars were represented by Kilmarnock F.C.

6 points for a win, 3 points for a tie, 0 points for a loss, 1 point for each goal scored up to three per game.

W = Wins, L = Losses, T= Ties, GF = Goals For, GA = Goals Against, Pts= point system

NASL Final 1969 season standings

The regular season rosters were made of the teams' own players. With no playoff or final, Kansas City was crowned league champion.

The team with the most points in the regular season was crowned league champion. Due to the NASL's unusual points system, this was not the team with the best won-loss percentage or the most victories. The Kansas City Spurs posted a record of 10 wins, 2 losses, and 4 ties, for 110 points to claim the title, while the Atlanta Chiefs posted a superior record of 11 wins, 2 losses, and 3 ties, but managed only 109 points.

6 points for a win, 3 points for a tie, 0 points for a loss, 1 point for each goal scored up to three per game.

W = Wins, L = Losses, T= Ties, GF = Goals For, GA = Goals Against, GD = Goal Differential, Pts= point system, Avg Att= Average Attendance
-Premiers (most points). -Best record.

{| class="wikitable" style="text-align:center"
|-
!! style="background:#071871" class="unsortable" colspan="9"| 1969 NASL season standings
|- 
!width=250|
!width=50|
!width=50|
!width=50|
!width=50|
!width=50|
!width=50|
!width=50|
!width=60|
|- align=center bgcolor=#BBF3BB
| align=left |Kansas City Spurs||10||2||4||53||28||+25||110||4,273
|- align=center bgcolor=#BBEBFF
| align=left |Atlanta Chiefs|||11||2||3||46||20||+26||109||3,371
|- align=center 
| align=left |Dallas Tornado||8||6||2||32||31||+1||82||2,923
|- align=center 
| align=left |St. Louis Stars||3||11||2||24||47||-23||47||2,274
|- align=center
| align=left |Baltimore Bays||2||13||1||27||56||-29||42||1,238
|}1969 NASL Champions: Kansas City Spurs

Full year standings

NASL All-Stars

Post season awardsMost Valuable Player: Cirilio Fernandez, Kansas CityCoach of the year: Janos Bedl, Kansas CityRookie of the year:''' Siegfried Stritzl, Baltimore

References

 
North American Soccer League (1968–1984) seasons
1969